The Museo Nacional Centro de Arte Reina Sofía ("Queen Sofía National Museum Art Centre"; MNCARS) is Spain's national museum of 20th-century art. The museum was officially inaugurated on September 10, 1992, and is named for Queen Sofía. It is located in Madrid, near the Atocha train and metro stations, at the southern end of the so-called Golden Triangle of Art (located along the Paseo del Prado and also comprising the Museo del Prado and the Museo Thyssen-Bornemisza).

The museum is mainly dedicated to Spanish art. Highlights of the museum include excellent collections of Spain's two greatest 20th-century masters, Pablo Picasso and Salvador Dalí. The most famous masterpiece in the museum is Picasso's 1937 painting Guernica. Along with its extensive collection, the museum offers a mixture of national and international temporary exhibitions in its many galleries, making it one of the world's largest museums for modern and contemporary art.  In 2021, due to the COVID-19 pandemic restrictions,  it attracted 1,643,108 visitors, up 32 percent from 2020, but well below 2019 attendance. In 2021 It ranked eighth on the list of most-visited art museums in the world.

It also hosts a free-access library specializing in art, with a collection of over 100,000 books, over 3,500 sound recordings, and almost 1,000 videos.

Collection

The museum is mainly dedicated to Spanish art. Highlights of the museum include excellent collections of Spain's two greatest 20th-century masters, Pablo Picasso and Salvador Dalí. Certainly, the most famous masterpiece in the museum is Picasso's painting Guernica. The Reina Sofía collection has works by artists such as Joan Miró, Eduardo Chillida, Pablo Gargallo, Julio González, Luis Gordillo, Juan Gris, José Gutiérrez Solana, Lucio Muñoz, Jorge Oteiza, Julio Romero de Torres, Pablo Serrano, and Antoni Tàpies.

International art represented in the collection include works by Francis Bacon, Joseph Beuys, Pierre Bonnard, Georges Braque, Alexander Calder, Robert Delaunay, Max Ernst, Lucio Fontana, Sarah Grilo, Damien Hirst, Donald Judd, Vasily Kandinsky, Paul Klee, Yves Klein, Fernand Léger, Jacques Lipchitz, René Magritte, Henry Moore, Bruce Nauman, Gabriel Orozco, Nam June Paik, Man Ray, Diego Rivera, Mark Rothko, Julian Schnabel, Richard Serra, Cindy Sherman, Clyfford Still, Yves Tanguy, and Wolf Vostell.

Gallery

History of the building

Hospital
The building is on the site of the first General Hospital of Madrid. King Philip II centralised all the hospitals that were scattered throughout the court. In the eighteenth century, King Ferdinand VI decided to build a new hospital because the facilities at the time were insufficient for the city. The building was designed by architect José de Hermosilla and his successor Francisco Sabatini who did the majority of the work. In 1805, after numerous work stoppages, the building was to assume its function that it had been built for, which was being a hospital, although only one-third of the proposed project by Sabatini was completed. Since then it has undergone various modifications and additions until, in 1969, it was closed down as a hospital.

Art museum
Extensive modern renovations and additions to the old building were made starting in 1980. The central building of the museum was once an 18th-century hospital. The building functioned as the Centro del Arte (Art Centre) from 1986 until established as the Museo Nacional Centro de Arte Reina Sofía in 1988. In 1988, portions of the new museum were opened to the public, mostly in temporary configurations; that same year it was decreed by the Ministry of Culture as a national museum. Its architectural identity was radically changed in 1989 by Ian Ritchie with the addition of three glass circulation towers.

Expansion
An 8000 m2 (86,000 ft2) expansion costing €92 million designed by French architect Jean Nouvel opened in October 2005. The extension includes spaces for temporary exhibitions, an auditorium of 500 seats, and a 200-seat auditorium, a bookshop, restaurants and administration offices. ducks scéno was consultant for scenographic equipment of auditoriums and Arau Acustica for acoustic studies.

Other facilities
Reina Sofía has other two places where several exhibitions usually take place. There are the Crystal Palace and the Velázquez Palace, both in Retiro Park.

Notable works
Guernica by Pablo Picasso
The Great Masturbator by Salvador Dalí
Equal-Parallel/Guernica-Bengasi by Richard Serra
6 TV Dé-Coll/age by Wolf Vostell

Popular culture references
The museum features, as a major protagonist, in Jim Jarmusch's The Limits of Control (2009).

In the 2003 Spanish film Noviembre, the school entrance scenes and some performance scenes were shot in the square in front of the museum.

See also 
 List of most visited art museums
 Museo de Escultura al Aire Libre de Alcalá de Henares

References
Informational notes

Citations

External links

Virtual tour of the Museo Nacional Centro de Arte Reina Sofía provided by Google Arts & Culture

Arte Reina Sofía
Reina Sofia
Reina Sofía
Reina Sofía
Reina Sofia
Museo Nacional Centro de Arte Reina Sofia
Museo Nacional Centro de Arte Reina Sofia
Defunct hospitals in Spain
Art museums established in 1992
Museo Nacional Centro de Arte Reina Sofia
Museo Nacional Centro de Arte Reina Sofia
Buildings and structures in Embajadores neighborhood, Madrid